The following is a list of Italo disco artists and songs, divided in two sections. The first section includes notable Italo disco groups and solo artists. The second section includes Italo disco songs. Solo artists are listed alphabetically by last name while groups are listed alphabetically by the first letter (not including the prefix "the", "a" or "an").

Artists

Alba
Albert One
Aleph
Baby's Gang
Baltimora
Alberto Camerini
Nadia Cassini
Claudio Cecchetto
Pino D'Angiò
Danuta
Tullio De Piscopo
Den Harrow
Valerie Dore
Tony Esposito
Fake
Fancy
Mike Francis
Fun Fun
Gazebo
Gepy & Gepy
Hipnosis (or Hypnosis)
Tom Hooker
Eddy Huntington
Jock Hattle
Kano
Klein + M.B.O.
Koto
La Bionda
Ken Laszlo
Gary Low
Mauro Malavasi
Mike Mareen
Martinelli
Sandy Marton
Miko Mission
Moon Ray (a.k.a. Raggio Di Luna)
Giorgio Moroder
Novecento
P. Lion
Ryan Paris
Radiorama
Raf
Righeira
Linda Jo Rizzo
Alexander Robotnick
Sabrina
Savage
Scotch
Silver Pozzoli
Claudio Simonetti

Spagna
Tracy Spencer
Taffy
Umberto Tozzi
Celso Valli
Via Verdi

Songs

See also
List of Euro disco artists
List of post-disco artists and songs

References

Bibliography

 
Italo disco
Italo disco